List of paintings and plots by Eugène Flandin and Pascal Coste, French painter and architects in 1840. This collection contains 200 images, 130 paintings from Flandin and 70 maps and plots from Coste which published in two books: Travel in Iran and Modern Monuments of Iran.

Maku ; Khosrova ; Tabriz

Eugène Flandin

Pascal Coste

Zanjan ; Abhar ; Soltaniyeh

Eugène Flandin

Pascal Coste

Qazvin ; Siadeh (Takestan)

Eugène Flandin

Pascal Coste

Tehran ; Solimanieh (Karaj)

Eugène Flandin

Pascal Coste

Qom ; Tegarood ; Kashan

Eugène Flandin

Pascal Coste

Isfahan

Eugène Flandin

Pascal Coste

Komijan ; Hamedan ; Nahavand ; Kangavar

Eugène Flandin

Pascal Coste

Bisotun ; Sahneh ; Taq-e Bostan ; Borujerd ; Yezd-e-Kast ; Mahyar

Eugène Flandin

Pascal Coste

Shiraz

Eugène Flandin

Pascal Coste

Naqsh-e Rustam ; Persepolis ; Pasargad

Eugène Flandin

Bander Bushehr ; Pir-a-Zan peak ; Firouzabad ; Kazerun ; Darabgerd ; Shushtar Province

Eugène Flandin 

Lists of works of art
French archaeologists
Archaeological sites in Iran